Lu Hao (born 30 January 1984) is a Chinese former professional tennis player.

Lu made his only ATP Tour singles main draw appearance as a wildcard at the 2004 China Open and won his first round match over Prakash Amritraj, before losing in the second round to eventual champion Marat Safin.

In 2004 and 2005 he featured in a total of three Davis Cup ties for China, winning two of his four singles rubbers.

ITF Futures titles

Doubles: (2)

References

External links
 
 
 

1984 births
Living people
Chinese male tennis players
21st-century Chinese people